This list of student awards is an index to articles that describe notable awards given to students.

General

University of Cambridge

University of Oxford
The University of Oxford is a collegiate research university in the city of Oxford, England, the oldest university in the English-speaking world.

See also

 Lists of awards
 :Category:Student athlete awards in the United States

References

 
Award
Student